Michael Hugh Medwin, OBE (18 July 1923 – 26 February 2020) was an English actor and film producer.

Life and career 
Medwin was born in London. He was educated at Canford School, Dorset, and the Institute Fischer, Montreux, Switzerland. He first appeared on stage in 1940.

Medwin's West End theatre credits include Man and Superman, The Rivals, Love for Love, Duckers and Lovers, Alfie, St Joan of the Stockyards, and What the Butler Saw. At the National Theatre he played a season which included Weapons of Happiness (Ralph Makepeace), Volpone (Corvino) and The Madras House. He appeared in Black Ball Game at the Lyric Hammersmith. He also played Lloyd Dallas in one of the casts of the long-running production of Noises Off in the early 1980s.

He is probably best known for his role as radio boss Don Satchley in the BBC television detective series Shoestring, as well as for playing Scrooge's nephew Fred in the film version of Scrooge, a musical based on Charles Dickens' A Christmas Carol, and for his role in The Army Game, a British television comedy series of the late 1950s and early 1960s. With Bernard Bresslaw, Leslie Fyson and Alfie Bass, he took the theme tune from The Army Game into the UK Singles Chart in 1958, where it peaked at number 5.

As well as his role in Shoestring, he played Colin's boss Mr Langley (of the Langley Book of Horror) in the Mel Smith comedy series Colin's Sandwich. In 1961, Medwin played the lead named Michael in BBC Radio Light Programme comedy series about an advertising company called Something to Shout About. In the same year he was the lead role in all 26 episodes of the comedy series Three Live Wires.

He made many film appearances, taking a leading role as Ginger Edwards in the 1953 Guy Hamilton film The Intruder, for which one critic wrote that Medwin "gives a brilliant study of a good fellow gone wrong."
Others included Carry On Nurse (1959) and The Longest Day (1962), before turning to producing films. Among the films he produced for Memorial Enterprises, a company he established with actor Albert Finney, are Charlie Bubbles (1967), directed by Finney, and Lindsay Anderson's If.... (1968), which won the Palme d'Or at the Cannes Film Festival. He worked again with Anderson on O Lucky Man! (1973), continuing the story of the Mick Travis character from their earlier film. Medwin has been quoted many times as saying "I knew at a young age I was going to be an actor: acting has always been in my bones". He also said that Charles Laughton and Edward G. Robinson were the two biggest influences in his life of acting, and considered being appointed OBE (Officer of the Order of the British Empire) in the 2005 Queens Birthday Honour's List for Services to Drama the single greatest thing that ever happened to him.

As a play producer, his work includes Spring and Port Wine, Alpha Beta, A Day in the Death of Joe Egg, Forget Me Not Lane and Another Country. Medwin formed with David Pugh in 1988, David Pugh Limited, a West End and Broadway theatrical production company, of which he remained chairman until his death on 26 February 2020.

Selected filmography

 Piccadilly Incident (1946) as Radio operator (uncredited)
 The Root of All Evil (1947) as Minor Role (uncredited)
 The Courtneys of Curzon Street (1947) – Edward Courtney Jr
 Black Memory (1947) as Johnnie Fletcher
 An Ideal Husband (1947) as Duke of Nonesuch
 Night Beat (1947) as Rocky
 Anna Karenina (1948) as Kitty's Doctor 
 Call of the Blood (1948) as Medical student (uncredited)
 Just William's Luck (1948) as Spiv
 My Sister and I (1948) as Charlie
 Woman Hater (1948) as Harris
 Look Before You Love (1948) as Emile Garat
 Another Shore (1948) as Yellow
 William Comes to Town (1948) as Reporter
 Operation Diamond (1948) as Sullivan
 Forbidden (1949) as Cabby
 The Queen of Spades (1949) as Hovaisky
 For Them That Trespass (1949) as Len, Herbie's bar pal 
 Helter Skelter (1949) as Man Giving BBC Boxing Talk (uncredited)
 Trottie True (1949) as Monty. Marquis of Maidenhead
 Boys in Brown (1949) as Alf 'Sparrow' Thompson
 Children of Chance (1949)
 Someone at the Door (1950) as Ronnie Martin
 Trio (1950) as Steward (in segment Mr. Know-All)
 The Lady Craved Excitement (1950) as Johnny
 Shadow of the Past (1950) as Dick Stevens
 The Long Dark Hall (1951) as Leslie Scott
 Four in a Jeep (1951) as Sergeant Harry Stuart
 Curtain Up (1952) as Jerry Winterton
 Love's a Luxury (1952) as Dick Pentwick
 Miss Robin Hood (1952) as Ernest
 Top Secret (1952) as Smedley
 Hindle Wakes (1952) as George Ackrody
 Street Corner (1953) as Chick Farrar
 Genevieve (1953) as Father to be (uncredited)
 The Oracle (1953) as Timothy Balke
 Malta Story (1953) as Ramsey, CO 'Phantom' Squadron (uncredited)
 Spaceways (1953) as Dr. Toby Andrews
 The Intruder (1953) as Ginger Edwards
 Bang! You're Dead (1954) as Bob Carter
 The Green Scarf (1954) as Teral
 The Teckman Mystery (1954) as Martin Teckman
 The Harassed Hero (1954) (uncredited) 
 Above Us the Waves (1955) as Smart
 Doctor at Sea (1955) as Sub-lieutenant Trail
 Charley Moon (1956) as Alf Higgins
 A Hill in Korea (1956) as Pvt. Docker
 Checkpoint (1956) as Ginger
 Doctor at Large (1957) as Dr. Charles Bingham
 The Steel Bayonet (1957) as Lt. Vernon
 The Duke Wore Jeans (1958) as Cooper
 The Wind Cannot Read (1958) Officer Lamb
 I Only Arsked! (1958) as Cpl. Springer
 The Heart of a Man (1959) as Sid
 Carry On Nurse (1959) as Ginger
 Crooks Anonymous (1962) as Ronnie Bassett
 The Longest Day (1962) as Pvt. Watney
 It's All Happening (1963) as Max Catlin
 Kali Yug: Goddess of Vengeance (1963) as Capt. Walsh
 Il mistero del tempio indiano (1964) as Capt. Walsh
 Night Must Fall (1964) as Derek
 Rattle of a Simple Man (1964) as Ginger
 I've Gotta Horse (1965) as Hymie Campbell
 24 Hours to Kill (1965) as The Crew: Tommy Gaskell 
 The Sandwich Man (1966) as Sewer Man
 A Countess from Hong Kong (1967) as John Felix
 Privilege (1967) as Jackman (uncredited)
 Spring and Port Wine (1970) as Driver at Traffic Lights (uncredited)
 Scrooge (1970) as Nephew Fred
 O Lucky Man! (1973) as Army Captain / Power station Technician / Duke of Belminster
 Law and Disorder (1974) as Man in Cab
 Pogled in potkrovlija (1976) as Ian Faulkner
 The Sea Wolves (1980) as Radcliffe
 Britannia Hospital (1982) as Theatre Surgeon
 The Jigsaw Man (1983) as Milroy
 Never Say Never Again (1983) as Doctor at Shrublands
 Sleepwalker (1984) as Waiter
 Hôtel du Paradis (1986) as English Producer
 Just Ask for Diamond (1988) as The Professor
 The Fool (1990) as Mr. Wells
 Staggered (1994) as Sarah's Father
 Alice Through the Looking Glass (1998) as Red King
 Fanny and Elvis (1999) as Registrar
 The Duchess (2008) as Speechmaker
 Framed (2008) as Dr. Louie Farraday (final film role)

References

External links

1923 births
2020 deaths
English male film actors
English film producers
English male television actors
Male actors from London
People educated at Canford School
Officers of the Order of the British Empire
20th-century English male actors
21st-century English male actors